Josh King (born 2 December 1995) is an Australian professional rugby league footballer who plays as a  and  for the Melbourne Storm in the NRL.

King previously played for the Newcastle Knights in the National Rugby League.

Background
King was born in Maitland, New South Wales, Australia. He was educated at Singleton High School.

King played his junior rugby league for the Singleton Greyhounds as well as junior representatives for the Newcastle Knights.

Playing career

Early career
In 2014 and 2015, King played for the Newcastle Knights' NYC team, before graduating to their New South Wales Cup team late in 2015.

2016
In round 7 of the 2016 NRL season, King made his NRL debut for Newcastle against the Brisbane Broncos. On 28 July, he extended his contract with Newcastle until the end of 2018. He finished his debut season with 12 appearances as the club finished last on the table and claimed the Wooden Spoon.

2017
In 2017, King was unable to break into the Knights' NRL side for the first 8 rounds, but went on to play 15 NRL matches for the season as the club finished bottom of the table for a third straight year.

2018
In March, King re-signed with the Knights on a two-year contract until the end of 2020.

2019
King played 13 games for Newcastle in the 2019 NRL season as the club missed the finals finishing in 11th place on the table.

2021
In August, after playing over 70 games for the Knights, King signed a 2-year contract with the Melbourne Storm starting in 2022.

2022
Round 1 of the 2022 NRL season, King made his club debut for the Melbourne Storm against Wests Tigers which ended in a win at Bankwest Stadium. He had his club debut jersey (cap number 219) presented to him by former Melbourne Storm player Robbie Kearns. King would be the only Melbourne Storm player to play every game in 2022, celebrating his 100th NRL game in round 23. He also made his senior representative debut when he was selected for the Australian Prime Minister's XIII against the Papua New Guinea Prime Minister's XIII in September.

References

External links
Melbourne Storm profile
Newcastle Knights profile

1995 births
Living people
Australian rugby league players
Newcastle Knights players
Melbourne Storm players
Rugby league props
Rugby league locks
Rugby league players from Maitland, New South Wales